John Wastell (1518) was an English gothic architect and master mason responsible for the fan vaulted ceiling and other features of King's College Chapel, Cambridge, the crossing tower (Bell Harry Tower) of Canterbury Cathedral, and sections of both Manchester and Peterborough cathedrals. He also worked on Bury St Edmunds Abbey.

References

1460 births
1515 deaths
Gothic architects
16th-century English architects
15th-century English architects